Internet services technology is a broad field of study usually resulting in receiving an Associate of Applied Science Degree. 

This two-year degree, often awarded at community colleges, is a gateway to more specialized studies, but can also be applied to immediate workforce demands.

Areas of Study
Students learn languages such as HTML, C++, ActionScript, and JavaScript. 

This program of study also encompasses business courses, with an emphasis on e-commerce and macroeconomics.

Internet services technology covers a broad range of technologies used for web development, web production, design, networking, and e-commerce. 

This field also covers website maintenance, database management, and graphic design.

References 

Computer science education